Indrani Rahman (19 September 1930, Chennai – 5 February 1999, New York) was an Indian classical dancer of Bharata Natyam, Kuchipudi, Kathakali and Odissi, which she popularised in the west, and later settled in New York in 1976.

In 1952, she won the Miss India pageant. Later, she joined her mother Ragini Devi's company. She popularised the Indian classical dance form, Odissi during her international tours. Indrani had received the Padma Shri in 1969 and the Sangeet Natak Akademi Award in the performing arts and also the Taraknath Das Award.

Background and family
Indrani Rahman was born in Chennai (then Madras), the daughter of Ramalal Balram Bajpai (1880–1962), sometime president of the Indo-American League, by his wife Ragini Devi (nee Esther Luella Sherman). Her father, Ramalal Bajpai, was of north Indian background, a chemist who went to the USA for higher education. Here he met and married Esther Luella Sherman, an American by birth. Born in Petoskey, Michigan in 1893, (died 1982), Esther embraced Hinduism upon her wedding and took the name 'Ragini Devi.'

The couple moved to India in the 1920s. Ramalal then took a job as Assistant Editor of Young India, the magazine founded by Lala Lajpat Rai. After Independence, he became the Consul General of India at New York, and president of the Indo-American League. Meanwhile, Ragini became a passionate proponent of Indian classical dance and devoted her life to their revival and nurture. This happened after a fateful meeting with the great rajadasi, (royal courtesan) Jetti Tayamma of Mysore, from whom she started learning Bharata Natyam. She then honed her dancing talents under the tutelage of Gauri Amma, a courtesan of Chennai. Ragini then became a celebrated dancer herself, and was among the most feted performers of the 1930s. Ragini also championed the revival of Kathakali during the same period.

Indrani was born in Chennai to this couple and grew up in a mixed-race household. She was brought up to be uninhibited and independent by her American mother, who encouraged her to participate in beauty pageants. As one of very few participants from across the country who could be persuaded to contest the pageant, Indrani was crowned 'Miss India' in the year 1952.

Career
Indrani started learning dance in her mother's company, at age nine, and accompanied her as she travelled through, Americas, and Europe. Professionally, she first started with Bharata Natyam, having learnt the Pandanallur style of Bharata Natyam from Guru Chokkalingam Pillai (1893–1968) in the 1940s. Soon she was in Vijaywada, learning Kuchipudi from Korada Narsimha Rao with whom she later toured many parts of the world.

In 1947, Indrani attracted the attention of India's leading dance and art critic Dr. Charles Fabri, who later encouraged her to go to Orissa and learn the little-known classical dance form of Odissi, making her the first professional dancer to learn Odissi. After learning Odissi for three years, from Guru Sri Deba Prasad Das, she went on to popularise it, through performance in various parts of India and the world.

In 1952, although married, and with a child, she became the first Miss India, and went on to compete in the Miss Universe 1952 Pageant, held at Long Beach, California. Soon, she was travelling along with her mother and performing all over the world. In 1961, she was the first dancer presented on a national tour by the Asia Society, and also performed for US President John F. Kennedy and Prime Minister Jawaharlal Nehru, during Nehru's official visit to Washington, D.C., and in the following years she also performed for Emperor Haile Selassie, Queen Elizabeth II, Mao Zedong, Nikita Khrushchev, and Fidel Castro. In 1976 she became a faculty member of the dance division at the Juilliard School at New York's Lincoln Center for the Performing Arts, taught in various American universities, including Harvard, and spent her remaining two decades in the United States, touring extensively.

Personal life
At the age of 15 she eloped and married Habib Rahman (1915–1995), a well-known architect, in 1945, the couple had a son, artist, Ram Rahman, and a daughter, Sukanya Rahman (Wicks), who also danced with her mother and grandmother. Her grandsons are Wardreath Wicks and Habib Wicks.

Death
Indrani Rahman died on 5 February 1999 in Manhattan, New York.

Awards
 1952: Femina Miss India
 1969: Padma Shri
 1981: Sangeet Natak Akademi Award

Further reading
 Dancing in the Family, by Sukanya Rahman. 2001, Harper Collins India, .
 Dance dialects of India, by Ragini Devi. Motilal Banarsidass Publ., 1990. , .

References

External links

 Archival footage of Indrani Rahman performing in Tarangam in 1979 at Jacob's Pillow.
 Photo feature on Indrani and Habib Rahman at Ram Rahman website 

1930 births
1999 deaths
20th-century Indian dancers
20th-century Indian educators
20th-century Indian women artists
American Hindus
American female dancers
American dancers
Artists from Chennai
Dancers from Tamil Nadu
Educators from Tamil Nadu
Femina Miss India winners
Harvard University faculty
Indian dance teachers
Indian female classical dancers
Women educators from Tamil Nadu
Juilliard School faculty
Kuchipudi exponents
Miss Universe 1952 contestants
Performers of Indian classical dance
Recipients of the Padma Shri in arts
Recipients of the Sangeet Natak Akademi Award
Teachers of Indian classical dance
Women artists from Tamil Nadu
Female models from Chennai
20th-century women educators
20th-century American women
20th-century American people
American women academics
Bharatanatyam exponents